Yerim Design High School is a private girls high school located in Gung-dong, Guro-gu, Seoul.

History
Yerim Design High School was founded on March 1, 1966 under the name Hangwang Commercial School (한광상업전수학교), before changing its name to Hangwang Girls' Commercial School (한광여자상업학교) on February 10, 1983. The school underwent three more name changes before changing it to its current Yerim Design High School on March 1, 2013. The current principal Choi Soon-hee was appointed on September 1, 2013 as the school's 15th principal.

Departments
 Visual Design
 Web Design
 Medical Management

Principals
List of principals of Yerim Design High School:
 1st: Jin In-kwon (1966.03.01—1976.12.20)
 2nd: Lee Chang-je (1976.12.20—1979.04.02)
 3rd: Shim Hyun-taek (1979.04.02—1984.02.10)
 4th: Bae Byung-cheol (1984.02.10—1992.01.25)
 5th: Jin In-kwon (1992.01.25—1995.03.02)
 6th: Han Gyu-hwan (1995.03.02—1995.09.11)
 7th: Shin Chang-kyu (1995.09.11—1998.03.02)
 8th: Kim Hyun-cheol (1998.03.02—1999.03.01)
 9th: Jin Chang-kwon (1999.03.01—2001.03.02)
 10th: Han Gyu-hwan (2001.03.02—2004.09.01)
 11th: Ha Yong-seon (2004.09.01—2007.09.01)
 12th: Jo Heung-sik (2007.09.01—2008.03.01)
 13th: Kim Jong-han (2008.03.01—2009.09.01)
 14th: Lee Moon-ok (2009.09.01—2013.09.01)
 15th: Choi Soon-hee (2013.09.01—present)

References

External links
 

High schools in Seoul
Design schools
Guro District, Seoul
Educational institutions established in 1966